Quassia harmandiana is a freshwater mangrove shrub or small tree in the Simaroubaceae family. It is found in Cambodia, Laos and Vietnam. The wood provides firewood. Certain fish eat the poisonous fruit

Description
This species grows as a shrub or small tree, some 5 to 8m tall. 
The species was placed in the section Samadera by Noteboom, along with Quassia indica. The plants of this section have simple leaves with roughly scattered concave glands, mostly on the under surface. The flowers are bisexual, occurring in axillary or terminal inflorescences, either pseudoumbels with peduncles or in racemes. There are 3-5 calyx lobes, these are imbricate in the bud, obtuse and have a concave gland in the centre. There are 3-5 contorted petals, much longer than the calyx, usually hairy on the underside. The disc is large, as high as it is broad, and gynophore-like. The style has a inconspicuous terminal stigma. The quite large fruits are compressed laterally, with a narrow, thinner, sharp-edged part in the apex half. Quassia harmandiana fruit are very large and dorsoventrally compressed. It flowers from March to May and fruits in July. 
The fruit are poisonous, see below.

Distribution
The species grows in the following countries: Cambodia, Laos, Vietnam.

Habitat, ecology
The plant grows in the mangrove and back-mangrove formations of the Mekong and Tonle Sap rivers and lake.

In the vegetation communities alongside the Mekong in Kratie and Steung Treng Provinces, Cambodia, this taxa is moderately abundant in the dense diverse strand community (last to be flooded each year, first to drain). It also occurs in mixed evergreen and deciduous forests in the area. It grows on soils derived from metamorphic sandstone bedrock, at 25-30m altitude.

In the Khone Falls section of the Mekong, in southern Laos, close to where the river becomes fully Cambodian, two species of carp-like fish, Leptobarbus hoevenii and Tor cf. tambra eat the fruits of this species.
The flesh of these fish is rendered poisonous after eating this and other fruit. In Tor cf. tambra the eyes become red and scales become whiter if poison is present, and if recognised, then the fish can be made edible by discarding the head and guts, then dried in the sun or marinated.

Vernacular names
Krahs and kra: (Khmer) are names used in Cambodia. Mak ngooan is a name from Laos.

Uses
The wood makes excellent firewood. The plant contains bactericidal compounds.

History
The Nederlander botanist, taxonomist and editor of Flora Malesiana (since 1999), Hans Peter Nooteboom (born 1934), described the species in 1962 (published in 1963) in his article "Generic delimitation in Simaroubaceae tribus Simaroubeae and a conspectus of the genus Quassia L.", in the journal Blumea.

Further reading
Dy Phon, P. (2000). Dictionnaire des plantes utilisées au Cambodge: 1-915. chez l'auteur, Phnom Penh, Cambodia.
Lê, T.C. (2003). Danh lục các loài thục vật Việt Nam [Checklist of Plant Species of Vietnam] 3: 1-1248. Hà Noi : Nhà xu?t b?n Nông nghi?p.
Newman, M., Ketphanh, S., Svengsuksa, B., Thomas, P., Sengdala, K., Lamxay, V. & Armstrong, K. (2007). A checklist of the vascular plants of Lao PDR: 1-394. Royal Botanic Gardens, Edinburgh.

References

harmandiana
Flora of Cambodia
Flora of Laos
Flora of Vietnam
Flora of Indo-China
Plants described in 1963